The draining law or Belgian dry up law (droogleggingswet) refers to a controversial law passed by the Belgian Federal Parliament in 2005 to cut funding by the federal state to "undemocratic" parties. Due to restrictions against campaign donations from private groups or individuals, Belgian political parties rely mostly on the state for funding.

Although the term "draining law" usually refers to the law passed in 2005, there are actually two so-called "draining laws":
the law of 12 February 1999, inserting an article 15 in the law of 4 July 1989 regarding the limitation and control of the electoral expenses for the elections of the federal Chambers, the financing and the open accounts of the political parties, and of an article 16bis in the laws on the Council of State, coordinated on 12 January 1973
the law of 17 February 2005, modifying the coordinated laws on the Council of State of 12 January 1973 and the law of 4 July 1989 regarding the limitation and control of the electoral expenses for the elections of the federal Chambers, the financing and the open accounts of the political parties

The law of 12 February 1999 inserted an article 15 in the law regarding party financing, which states that if a political party by its own effort or by the effort of its components, lists, candidates or elected officials, clearly and with several similar signs, shows that it is hostile towards the rights and liberties guaranteed under the European Convention on Human Rights, it can be stripped of its funding by the Council of State. This is why in French, the law is also referred to as the "law to cut funding to anti-liberty parties" ("loi permettant de priver les partis liberticides de leur financement"). However, this provision could not be implemented until the passage of the law of 17 February 2005.

Vlaams Belang

At the present time an attempt to use the law would most likely be made against the far-right Flemish party Vlaams Belang. A Belgian court ruled in 2004 that the party's predecessor Vlaams Blok had encouraged discrimination against foreigners. According to the party's supporters, both the 2004 conviction and the current bill are political actions by their opponents.

After the Supreme Court ruling, the leadership of the VB seized the occasion to dissolve itself, and start afresh under a new name. On 14 November, the Vlaams Blok thus disbanded itself, and the Vlaams Belang was established. The Vlaams Belang instituted a number of changes in its political program, carefully moderating some of the more radical positions of the former Vlaams Blok. Nevertheless, the party leader Frank Vanhecke made it clear that the party would fundamentally remain the same; "We change our name, but not our tricks. We change our name, but not our programme."

Former Vlaams Blok chairman Frank Vanhecke was chosen as chairman of the Vlaams Belang on 12 December 2004. Like its predecessor, the Vlaams Belang has continued to be subjected to the cordon sanitaire, wherein all the traditional Flemish parties has agreed to systematically exclude the party, and never form a coalition with it. This situation was however altered slightly with the emergence of the smaller right-wing party List Dedecker (founded in 2007), which has not joined in on the agreement. In an interview with the popular weekly Humo, Flemish Prime Minister Yves Leterme for instance declared that a local chapter of his Christian Democratic and Flemish party (CD&V) that would form a coalition or close agreements with the Vlaams Belang, would no longer be considered part of the CD&V.

The VB contested the 2006 municipal elections on the theme of "Secure, Flemish, Liveable". The VB enjoyed a massive increase of votes, and its council members almost doubled, from 439 to about 800. The election result was described by the party as a "landslide victory." In Antwerp, the VB's vote count ran behind that of the Socialist Party, which increased their share of the vote dramatically. Nevertheless, the VB, which was in a coalition with the minor VLOTT party, slightly increased their vote in the city to 33.5%. In the 2007 general election, the party won 17 seats in the Chamber of Representatives and five seats in the Senate, remaining more or less at status quo. Earlier the same year, the party joined the short-lived European Parliament group Identity, Tradition and Sovereignty alongside parties such as the French National Front.

In 2008, Bruno Valkeniers was chosen as new party chairman for the VB, having contested the position unopposed. In 2009, the party contested elections for the Flemish Parliament and the European Parliament. The party was reduced from 32 to 21 seats (from the Vlaams Blok's record 24%, to 15%) in the Flemish parliament, and from three to two seats in the European parliament. In the 2010 general election, the party was again reduced, to 12 seats in the Chamber, and three in the Senate. This was largely due to the great success of the more moderate new party New Flemish Alliance, which also campaigned on Flemish independence. After the party suffered heavy losses during the local elections of 2012 Bruno Valkeniers stepped down as party chairman and was succeeded by Gerolf Annemans.

In the 2014 federal and regional elections the party again suffered a big loss and was reduced to 5.9% of the Flemish vote. The European list, pulled by Annemans, scored slightly better with 6.8%. Annemans resigned as party leader, a function he only performed for two years, and argued for a rejuvenation of the party. The following party chairman election was won by the only candidate, the then 28 years old Tom Van Grieken.

References

Dry up law
2005 in law
Political funding
2005 in Belgium
Politics of Belgium